Bromham is a civil parish in Bedford, Bedfordshire, England. It contains 27 listed buildings that are recorded in the National Heritage List for England.  Of these, one is listed at Grade I, the highest of the three grades, one is listed at Grade II*, the middle grade and, the others are at Grade II, the lowest grade.

Key

Buildings

References

Lists of listed buildings in Bedfordshire
Listed buildings in the Borough of Bedford